Karahara is a village in Agra, in the Indian state of Uttar Pradesh. Seven communities make up the village. It is surrounded by Dalsa Ka Nagla, Sagunapur, Dabla, Dabli Akhwai, Aladdin and other villages.

There is a traditional system of haath on Monday and Thursday in which people get fresh vegetables. Karahara has small shops selling kirana and fertilizer. The State Bank of India provides financial services. A government hospital is located there.

The population is 10000. The people speak HINDI(braj).

The main crop is wheat.

The village has primary schools, Junior Highschool, Intermediate college and a private degree college affiliated to Bhim Rao Ambedkar University.
Present Pradhan Of Village is Mr. Cheto singh
Pin code of karahara 283105.

References

Villages in Agra district